The 18th Annual Grammy Awards were held February 28, 1976, and were broadcast live on American television. They recognized accomplishments by musicians from the year 1975.

Award winners 
Record of the Year
"Love Will Keep Us Together" - Captain & Tennille (artist) & Daryl Dragon (producer)
Album of the Year
Still Crazy After All These Years - Paul Simon (artist) - Phil Ramone & Paul Simon (producers)
Song of the Year
"Send In the Clowns" - Judy Collins (artist) - Stephen Sondheim (songwriter)
Best New Artist
Natalie Cole

Children's

Best Recording for Children
Richard Burton for The Little Prince

Classical

Best Classical Performance – Orchestra
Pierre Boulez (conductor), the Camarata Singers & the New York Philharmonic for Ravel: Daphnis et Chloé (Complete Ballet)
Best Classical Vocal Performance
Janet Baker for Mahler: Kindertotenlieder
Best Opera Recording
Erik Smith (producer), Colin Davis (conductor), Richard van Allan, Janet Baker, Montserrat Caballé, Ileana Cotrubas, Wladimiro Ganzarolli, Nicolai Gedda & the Orchestra of the Royal Opera House for Mozart: Cosi Fan Tutte
Best Choral Performance, Classical (other than opera)
Michael Tilson Thomas (conductor), Robert Page (choir director) the Cleveland Boys Choir & Cleveland Orchestra Chorus- Orff: Carmina Burana
Best Classical Performance Instrumental Soloist or Soloists (with orchestra)
Rafael Frühbeck de Burgos (conductor), Alicia de Larrocha & the London Philharmonic for Ravel: Concerto for Left Hand and Concerto for Piano in G/Fauré: Fantaisie for Piano and Orchestra
Best Classical Performance Instrumental Soloist or Soloists (without orchestra)
Nathan Milstein for Bach: Sonatas and Partitas for Violin Unaccompanied
Best Chamber Music Performance
Pierre Fournier, Arthur Rubinstein & Henryk Szeryng for Schubert: Trios Nos. 1 in B Flat, Op. 99 and 2 in E Flat, Op. 100 (Piano Trios)
Album of the Year, Classical
Raymond Minshull (producer), Georg Solti (conductor) & the Chicago Symphony Orchestra for Beethoven: Symphonies (9) Complete

Comedy

Best Comedy Recording
Richard Pryor for Is It Something I Said?

Composing and arranging

Best Instrumental Composition 
Michel Legrand for Images performed by Michel Legrand & Phil Woods
Album of Best Original Score Written for a Motion Picture or a Television Special
John Williams (composer) for Jaws
Best Instrumental Arrangement
Pete Carpenter & Mike Post (arrangers) for "The Rockford Files" performed by Mike Post
Best Arrangement Accompanying Vocalist(s)
Ray Stevens (arranger) for "Misty"

Country

Best Country Vocal Performance, Female
Linda Ronstadt for "I Can't Help It (If I'm Still in Love With You)"
Best Country Vocal Performance, Male
Willie Nelson for "Blue Eyes Crying in the Rain"
Best Country Vocal Performance by a Duo or Group
Rita Coolidge & Kris Kristofferson for "Lover Please"
Best Country Instrumental Performance
Chet Atkins for "The Entertainer"
Best Country Song
Larry Butler & Chips Moman (songwriters) for "(Hey Won't You Play) Another Somebody Done Somebody Wrong Song" performed by B. J. Thomas

Folk

Best Ethnic or Traditional Recording
Muddy Waters for The Muddy Waters Woodstock Album

Gospel

Best Gospel Performance (other than soul gospel)
The Imperials for No Shortage
Best Soul Gospel Performance
Andrae Crouch for Take Me Back performed by Andrae Crouch & the Disciples
Best Inspirational Performance
The Bill Gaither Trio for Jesus, We Just Want to Thank You

Jazz

Best Jazz Performance by a Soloist
Dizzy Gillespie for Oscar Peterson and Dizzy Gillespie
Best Jazz Performance by a Group
Chick Corea & Return to Forever for No Mystery
Best Jazz Performance by a Big Band
Michel Legrand & Phil Woods for Images

Latin

Best Latin Recording
Eddie Palmieri for Sun of Latin Music

Musical show

Best Cast Show Album
Charlie Smalls (composer),  Jerry Wexler (producer) & the original cast with Stephanie Mills & Dee Dee Bridgewater for The Wiz

Packaging and notes

Best Album Package
Jim Ladwig (art director) for Honey performed by the Ohio Players
Best Album Notes
Pete Hamill (notes writer) for Blood on the Tracks performed by Bob Dylan
Best Album Notes – Classical
Gunther Schuller (notes writer) for Footlifters performed by Gunther Schuller

Pop
Best Pop Vocal Performance, Female
"At Seventeen"-Janis Ian
Best Pop Vocal Performance, Male
"Still Crazy After All These Years"-Paul Simon
Best Pop Vocal Performance by a Duo, Group or Chorus
"Lyin' Eyes"-The Eagles
Best Pop Instrumental Performance
"The Hustle"-Van McCoy

Production and engineering
Best Engineered Recording, Non-Classical
Brooks Arthur, Larry Alexander & Russ Payne for Janis Ian's Between the Lines
Best Engineered Recording, Classical
Edward (Bud) T. Graham, Milton Cherin, Ray Moore (engineers), Pierre Boulez (conductor), the Camarata Singers & the New York Philharmonic for Ravel: Daphnis et Chloe (Complete Ballet)
Producer of the Year, Non-Classical
Arif Mardin

R&B

Best R&B Vocal Performance, Female
Natalie Cole for "This Will Be"
Best R&B Vocal Performance, Male
Ray Charles for "Living for the City"
Best R&B Vocal Performance by a Duo, Group or Chorus
Earth, Wind & Fire for "Shining Star"
Best R&B Instrumental Performance
Silver Convention for "Fly, Robin, Fly"
Best Rhythm & Blues Song
Harry Wayne Casey, Willie Clarke, Richard Finch & Betty Wright (songwriters) for "Where Is the Love" performed by Betty Wright

Spoken

Best Spoken Word Recording
James Whitmore for Give 'Em Hell Harry

References

External links
The 18th Grammy Awards , at the Internet Movie Database

 018
1976 in California
1976 music awards
1976 in Los Angeles
1976 in American music
Grammy
February 1976 events in the United States